Allen John Tankard (born 21 March 1969) is an English former footballer who played as a left-back. He played 519 league games in a 16-year career in the Football League.

He began his career with Southampton in 1987, before moving on to Wigan Athletic the following year. He spent five years with the "Latics", being voted the club's player of the year in 1992–93, before making a £87,500 move to Port Vale in July 1993. He spent the next eight years at Vale Park, helping the club to win promotion out of the Third Division in 1993–94, and to reach the final of the Football League Trophy in 2001. He retired from the professional game after helping Mansfield Town to win promotion out of the Third Division in 2001–02.

Career
Tankard started his football career with Southampton, signing YTS forms in June 1985. He played in pre-season friendly games two months after his sixteenth birthday. He won caps for the England under-17 team. However he struggled with is weight and after only five appearances it was apparent he had no future at The Dell, and so he signed with Wigan Athletic in July 1988. The "Latics" finished 17th in the Third Division in 1988–89 under Ray Mathias's stewardship, just four places and two points above relegated Southend United. They dropped to 18th in 1989–90 under new boss Bryan Hamilton, three places and three points ahead of relegated Cardiff City. Wigan then rose to tenth in 1990–91, three places outside of the play-offs. They then dropped to 15th in 1991–92, before suffering relegation with a 23rd-place finish in 1992–93; it would prove to be his last season at Springfield Park, and Tankard departed after being voted as the club's player of the year.

In July 1993, John Rudge signed Tankard to Port Vale for a £87,500 fee. Initially unpopular with the fans, he turned things around at Vale Park after a last minute FA Cup winner against Huddersfield Town in the FA Cup second round. He spent December to April of the 1993–94 season on the sidelines due to a hamstring injury, but his performances whilst fit helped the club to promotion out of the Third Division. He played regular football in the 1994–95 season, helping the club to avoid relegation out of the (newly re-branded) First Division by a ten-point margin. He was again a regular in the 1995–96 campaign, until he was sidelined again in March due to another hamstring injury.

Following his recovery, he played 44 games of the 1996–97 season, one of the most successful of the club's history, as Vale posted an eighth-place finish, two places and four points below Crystal Palace, who went on to win promotion to the Premier League as winners of the play-offs. He made 42 appearances in the 1997–98 season, helping the "Valiants" to avoid the drop by finishing three places and just one point above relegated Manchester City. However his reputation was somewhat sullied in an FA Cup third-round game on 14 January 1998, as he blasted his penalty over the bar in the penalty shoot-out with Arsenal; it was the final kick of the 4–3 defeat (the game had finished 1–1 in normal time). Recovering from their lacklustre third round performance, Arsenal would later go on to win the competition.

In 1998–99, Tankard was the only outfield player to hit the 40 game mark for the Vale, and also netted goals against Watford, Crystal Palace, Norwich City, and Oxford United. The club went on to avoid relegation only due to the fact that they had scored more goals than Bury. However relegation came in the 1999–2000 season under new manager Brian Horton; Tankard played 37 games, scoring in a 3–2 win over Sheffield United at Bramall Lane. He remained loyal to the Burslem club despite their fall into the Second Division, and played 39 games in the 2000–01 season, scoring a personal best of five goals. He also played every game of Vale's run to the final of the Football League Trophy; however he was an unused substitute for the final itself at the Millennium Stadium, which Vale won with a 2–1 victory over Brentford. Tankard was released in June 2001 after turning down the club's offer a new contract. In all he had made 324 first team appearances for Port Vale, scoring 13 goals. One of the club's most consistent performers, years later the club were still trying to fill the void Tankard's departure had left in the left-back role. In May 2019, he was voted into the "Ultimate Port Vale XI" by members of the OneValeFan supporter website.

He spent the 2001–02 season with Mansfield Town, helping Bill Dearden's "Stags" to gain the third and final automatic promotion place of the Third Division, one point ahead of Cheltenham Town. He was contracted with the club for the 2002–03 season, but did not make any appearances at Field Mill. He then had brief spells with Southern League clubs Hednesford Town and Stafford Rangers.

Post-retirement
After retiring from the game, Tankard worked at a minibus and coach hire company in Stone, Staffordshire.

Career statistics
Source:

Honours
Port Vale
Football League Third Division second-place promotion: 1993–94
Anglo-Italian Cup runner-up: 1995–96
Football League Trophy: 2001

Mansfield Town
Football League Third Division third-place promotion winner: 2001–02

Individual
Wigan Athletic Player of the Year: 1992–93

References

1969 births
Living people
Footballers from Islington (district)
English footballers
England youth international footballers
Association football fullbacks
Southampton F.C. players
Wigan Athletic F.C. players
Port Vale F.C. players
Mansfield Town F.C. players
Hednesford Town F.C. players
Stafford Rangers F.C. players
English Football League players
Southern Football League players